Pershing House has been the residence of the commanding officers of Fort Sam Houston since 1881.
Located in Bexar County, San Antonio, Texas, the military post is currently part of Joint Base San Antonio. The house was added to the National Register of Historic Places listings on 30 July 1974. After the Texas annexation to the Union in 1845, the United States Army became a steady presence in what was then designated the Department of Texas, providing a line of defense during both the 1846–1848 Mexican–American War, and the Texas–Indian wars that ended with the 1875 surrender of Comanche chief Quanah Parker at Fort Sill, Oklahoma. The combining of Fort Sam Houston, Randolph Air Force Base, Lackland Air Force Base and Martindale Army Airfield, to create Joint Base San Antonio, took place in 2009.

Following the end of the American Civil War, the United States Department of War accepted an offer from San Antonio for three parcels of land on which the United States Army would construct Fort Sam Houston. The site and its surrounding area would come to be known as Government Hill. Edward Braden Construction began work on the project in 1876. Architect Alfred Giles designed the general staff quarters, as well as the commanding general's quarters, now known at Pershing House. Constructed in 1881 at a cost of $17,076 (equivalent to $457,000 in 2020), it was originally designated as "Quarters No. 6, Staff Post". The , two-story house has eleven rooms, six full bathrooms and one half bath. In various phases during the 20th century, improvements included an enclosed porch and upgrades to plumbing, electricity and air conditioning.

While under its original name, the house would become the residence of 16 succeeding commanding officers. They were some of the most accomplished leaders in the United States Army prior to their being given charge of the base. The first occupant of the house was Major General Christopher C. Augur, a West Point graduate and veteran of several military conflicts, including the Mexican–American War and the American Civil War. Numerous Medal of Honor recipients have resided there.

The house has been referred to by its current name since John J. Pershing served as the base commanding officer in 1917, following his participation in the Pancho Villa Expedition. He was at Fort Sam Houston only two months before being given charge of the American Expeditionary Forces in Europe. Pershing held the rank of General of the Armies. The only other American to hold that rank was George Washington. The names of all the occupants from 1881 through 1973 appear on two brass-plated plaques that were initially created in the 1950s by Julia Cotton White, wife of General Isaac D. White, who was then serving as commanding officer. She presented them as a gift to Fort Sam Houston, and they were kept up to date by succeeding residents at least through 1973 when the house was added to the National Register of Historic Places.

Commanding officer chronology 1881 through 1973

Key to military ranks
GA General of the Armies (5 stars)
CSA Chief of Staff of the United States Army, General (4 stars). As of 1943, all Chiefs of Staff are stationed in The Pentagon. Prior to that date, they all worked on-site at local bases.
4SG General (4 stars)
LG Lieutenant General (3 stars)
MG Major General (2 stars)
BG Brigadier General (1 star)

Key to burial sites

Residents

See also
List of major generals in the United States Regular Army before 1 July 1920
Major general (United States)
General officers in the United States
List of United States Army four-star generals
List of lieutenant generals in the United States Army before 1960
List of brigadier generals in the United States Regular Army before February 2, 1901

Notes

Footnotes

References

Bibliography

External links

History of San Antonio
Historic district contributing properties in Texas
Houses in San Antonio
Houses on the National Register of Historic Places in Texas
National Register of Historic Places in San Antonio
Tourist attractions in San Antonio
Joint Base San Antonio
Buildings and structures in San Antonio